Athletes from Kuwait participated in the 16th Asian Games in Guangzhou, Guangdong, China from 12 November to 27 November 2010. These athletes competed under the Olympic flag because the Kuwait Olympic Committee had been suspended by the International Olympic Committee in January 2010. A total of 195 athletes competed, of which 19 were women.

Medal table

Medalists

Athletics

The men's team comprised 23 athletes.

Basketball

The men's team comprised 11 athletes.

Bowling

Both men's and women's teams of 6 athletes each were sent.

Boxing

A 2 member team was sent

Cue sports

The team comprised 11 members (7 men and 4 women)

Diving

A 4 member men's team was sent

Football

A men's team of 20 was sent.

Fencing

A 12 member men's team was sent.

Artistic Gymnastics

A 6 member men's team was sent.

Handball

The men's team comprised 16 members.

Judo

Both men's (7) and women's (3) teams competed.

Karate

A 4 member men's team competed.

Rowing

A 3 member men's team competed.

Shooting

Both men's (10) and women's (3) teams competed.

Squash

A 4 member men's was sent.

Swimming

A 5 member men's was sent.

Volleyball

A 12 member men's was competed.

Table Tennis

A 2 member men's team was sent.

Taekwondo

A 6 member men's team was sent.

Water polo

A 13 member men's team was sent

Weightlifting

A 6 member men's team was sent

See also 
 Athletes from Kuwait at the 2010 Summer Youth Olympics
 Kuwait at the 2010 Asian Para Games
 Athletes from Kuwait at the 2011 Asian Winter Games

References

Nations at the 2010 Asian Games
2010
Asian Games